The High Commission of Denmark in the Faroe Islands is a Danish institution in the Faroe Islands.

The High Commissioner represents the crown and the Kingdom Government in the Faroe Islands. The office is responsible for liaising between the Territorial Home Rule Government (Landsstýri) and the Government of Denmark.

The Government of the Faroe Islands notifies the High Commission of all statutes and regulations adopted by the Parliament of the Faroe Islands (Løgting) and of any other general legislation drawn up by the Government of the Faroe Islands. In addition, the Government of the Faroe Islands may call on the High Commissioner to participate in negotiations within Faroese institutions.

The High Commission draws up an annual report on the condition of Faroese society.

The High Commissioner of the Faroe Islands

The High Commissioner is permitted to participate in all negotiations concerning matters of common interest in the Lagting (the Parliament of the Faroe Islands) and without, however, having the right to vote.

The High Commission is an ex-officio member of the Danish-Faroese Cultural Foundation.

See also
High Commission of Denmark, Nuuk

References

External links
Official website

Politics of the Faroe Islands
Politics of Denmark